Penberthy is a locational surname of Cornish origin, which meant a person from Penberthy Cross in Cornwall. Notable people with the surname include:

Bob Penberthy (born 1943), British rugby player 
Beverly Penberthy (born 1949), American actress
Bryan Penberthy (born 1976), American poet
David Penberthy (born 1969), Australian journalist
James Penberthy (1917–1999), Australian musician
Joanna Penberthy (born 1960), Welsh Anglican bishop
Larry Penberthy (1916–2001), American businessman
Mike Penberthy (born 1974), American basketball player
Stan Penberthy (1906–1989), Australian football player
Tony Penberthy (born 1969), British cricket player

See also
 Penberthy Croft Mine

References

Cornish-language surnames
Surnames of British Isles origin